Chadwick "Corntassel" Smith (Cherokee name Ugista:ᎤᎩᏍᏔ derived from Cherokee word for "Corntassel", Utsitsata:ᎤᏥᏣᏔ; born December 17, 1950, in Pontiac, Michigan) is a former Principal Chief of the Cherokee Nation. He was first elected in 1999. Smith was re-elected to a second term as Chief in 2003 and a third term in June 2007 with 59% of the vote. He was defeated in his attempt to get elected to a fourth term in office by Bill John Baker 54% to 46% in the 2011 election and he lost again to Baker in 2015, receiving 28% of the vote.  Prior to being elected Principal Chief, he worked as a lawyer for the tribe and in private practice.

Early life and education
Chad Smith was born in Pontiac, Michigan, where his father had gone for work. His parents were Nelson Smith, a Cherokee, and Pauline Smith, (western European ancestry). He grew up in Nashville, Tennessee. As a boy, Smith achieved the rank of Eagle Scout in the Boy Scouts in Nashville.

He grew up with stories of his Cherokee ancestors. He is the great-grandson of Redbird Smith, a Cherokee Nation Senator and a traditionalist who founded the Nighthawk Keetoowah Society, a religious, cultural, and political organization dedicated to reviving the Cherokee way of life. Redbird Smith fought the allotment policy, under which the United States government took more than 7,000,000 acres (28,000 km²) of land from the Cherokee. Rachel Quinton, Chad Smith's grandmother, was a lifelong advocate for the Cherokee people and the treasurer for the United Keetoowah Band of Cherokee Indians.

Smith received a bachelor's degree in education from the University of Georgia in 1973, a master's degree in public administration from the University of Wisconsin in 1975, a Juris Doctor degree from the University of Tulsa in 1980, and an MBA in Hospitality Management from the University of Nevada-Las Vegas in 2008.

Professional life

From 1979 to 1980, Smith served a consultant in Indian Law and Tribal Management to the Cherokee Nation's Tribal Operations. From 1982 to 1986, he served as Assistant District Attorney in Creek County, Oklahoma. On two separate occasions, Smith served as the Estate Tax Attorney of the United States Department of Treasury, from 1980 to 1982 and from 1987 to 1989. He was a prosecutor for the Cherokee Nation during 1985–1995 (during the Wilma Mankiller administration).

From 1989 to 1995 and from 1997 to 1999, he operated a private law practice out of Tulsa, Oklahoma, representing clients in civil rights litigation and appeals, criminal defense, and general civil litigation, with a focus on Indian law. Smith served as an Assistant Public Defender and served as counsel to economically deprived defendants in the District Court of Tulsa County.

Prior to his service as Principal Chief, Smith taught Indian law at Northeastern State University, Rogers State University, and for a semester at Dartmouth College while he was a visiting fellow.

From 1999 to 2011, Smith served as Principal Chief of the Cherokee Nation, the second largest Indian tribe in the United States with more than 285,000 citizens.

Before becoming Principal Chief, Smith taught Indian law at Dartmouth College, Northeastern State University and Rogers State University. He served two previous Cherokee Nation chiefs as Director of Tribal Planning, Legal Historian, Cherokee Nation Prosecutor, Director of Justice and Advisor to the Tribal Tax Commission. He also successfully operated his own law practice, served Tulsa County as an assistant public defender and worked as an assistant district attorney in Creek County.

Political career

Smith completed his third 4-year term as Principal Chief of the Cherokee Nation in 2011. The Principal Chief is the head of the executive branch of the tribal government. The position is responsible for the execution of the laws of the Cherokee Nation, establishment of tribal policy, and delegation of authority for the day-to-day operations of the tribe. Before his election, Smith served under two Cherokee Nation chiefs as Director of Tribal Planning, Legal Historian, Attorney, Cherokee Nation Prosecutor, Director of Justice and adviser to the tribal tax commission.

Smith was elected Principal Chief on July 24, 1999, defeating the incumbent Principal Chief Joe Byrd in  a runoff election. Byrd's first term was marked with tension and constitutional crisis issues. Smith received 7,204 votes (56.48%) to Byrd's 5,552 votes (43.52%). During his first term, Hastings Shade, a Cherokee traditionalist, language teacher, artist, and author, served as deputy chief.

Smith was re-elected to subsequent terms in 2003 and 2007, with Joe Grayson as deputy chief, who is a bilingual, full-blood community organizer and military veteran.

In 2006, Smith supported amending the constitution of the Cherokee Nation to restrict citizenship to those having "Indian blood". This action expelled about 2,800 people from the tribe who were known as the Cherokee freedmen, as they were descended from people who had been enslaved by Cherokees rather than being Cherokee by blood. Smith argued that since the Cherokee were a sovereign nation, they could establish their own rules for qualification of citizenship. The action was contrary to a post–Civil War treaty that said the Nation had given full citizenship rights to the formerly enslaved people, and was disputed in both U.S. federal courts and Cherokee Nation courts.

Smith ran for a fourth term in 2011. His running mate was Chris Soap, son of Charlie Soap, husband of the late Principal Chief Wilma Mankiller. He was challenged by Bill John Baker, who supported inclusion of descendants of freedmen in the tribe. The election was held on June 25, 2011. Both candidates have twice been declared the winner, because voting was so close. Because the results could not be determined with mathematical certainty, the Cherokee Nation Supreme Court ordered a second vote for Sept. 24, 2011. As the Cherokee Nation constitution does not allow elected officials to remain in office past Inauguration Day, Smith left office on Aug. 14, 2011.  S. Joe Crittenden was sworn in as deputy chief, and elevated to acting principal chief in accordance with the constitutional chain of succession.

During his tenure as principal chief, Smith focused on three initiatives: economic self-reliance for the tribe, Cherokee language and cultural revitalization, and community development in Northeastern Oklahoma. Language immersion programs for Cherokee children and youth have been established.  Smith popularized the term gadugi, which in Cherokee refers to the spontaneous work crews communities formed as needs arose.  It has come to mean coming together to work for the good of all Cherokee.

The modern Cherokee Nation has had steady economic growth. During Smith's tenure, agricultural growth, and business, corporate, real estate expansion occurred.  Some has been funded by revenues from numerous casino operations. The Cherokee Nation controls Cherokee Nation Entertainment, a gaming and hospitality company with several thousand employees in Eastern Oklahoma, as well as Cherokee Nation Industries, a defense contractor. .

Since 1992 the Cherokee Nation has served as the lead tribe for the Inter-Tribal Environmental Council (ITEC). The mission of ITEC is to protect the health of Native Americans, their natural resources, and their environment as it relates to air, land, and water. To accomplish this mission, ITEC provides technical support, training and environmental services in a variety of environmental disciplines. There are 39 ITEC member tribes in Oklahoma, New Mexico, and Texas.

In February 2021, the Supreme Court of the Cherokee Nation rejected the citizenship restriction that had been passed at the instigation of Smith, saying "The 'by blood' language found within the Cherokee Nation Constitution, and any laws which flow from that language, is illegal, obsolete, and repugnant to the ideal of liberty. These words insult and degrade the descendants of the Freedman much like the Jim Crow laws found lingering on the books in Southern states some fifty-seven years after the passage of the 1964 Civil Rights Act." The restriction had also been rejected in a U.S. district court in 2017.

Family
Smith is married to Bobbie Gail Smith, a full-blooded Cherokee from the Rocky Mountain community of Adair County, Oklahoma.

Published works
 Smith, Chadwick Corntassel and Rennard Strickland with Benny Smith. ᎥᎪᏢᏍᎬ ᏌᏊ ᎠᏥᎸ: Building One Fire, Art and World View in Cherokee Life. Norman: University of Oklahoma Press, 2010. .
 McClinton, Rowena and Chad Smith. The Moravian Springplace Mission to the Cherokees. Lincoln: University of Nebraska Press, 2007. .
 Robert J. Conley, author, David Fitzgerald, photography, and Chadwick Smith, introduction. Cherokee. Portland, OR: Graphic Arts Center Publishing Co., 2002. .
 Smith, Chadwick Corntassel. Leadership Lessons from the Cherokee Nation: Learn From All I Observe. McGraw-Hill, 2013.  .

References

External links

Chad Smith official website

1950 births
Living people
Politicians from Pontiac, Michigan
American lawyers
University of Georgia alumni
University of Tulsa College of Law alumni
Robert M. La Follette School of Public Affairs alumni
Principal Chiefs of the Cherokee Nation
20th-century Native Americans
21st-century Native Americans
Native American people from Michigan
Public defenders